Ethyl acetoxy butanoate (EAB) is a volatile chemical compound found as a minor component of the odour profile of ripe pineapples, though in its pure form it has a smell more similar to sour yoghurt. It can be metabolized in humans into GHB, and thus can produce similar sedative effects.

It is synthesised by the reaction of gamma-butyrolactone and ethyl acetate with sodium ethoxide.

See also
 1,4-Butanediol (1,4-BD)
 1,6-Dioxecane-2,7-dione
 Aceburic acid
 gamma-Hydroxybutyraldehyde

References

Acetate esters
Butyrate esters
GABAB receptor agonists
GHB receptor agonists
Prodrugs
Sedatives